The Rio Grande Council of Governments (RGCOG) is a voluntary association of cities, counties and special districts in West Texas and Doña Ana County, New Mexico

Based in El Paso, the Rio Grande Council of Governments is a member of the Texas Association of Regional Councils.

Counties served
Brewster
Culberson
El Paso
Hudspeth
Jeff Davis
Presidio
Doña Ana County, New Mexico

Largest cities in the region
El Paso
Alamogordo, New Mexico
Las Cruces, New Mexico
Socorro
Sunland Park, New Mexico
Horizon City 
Anthony
Presidio

References

External links
Rio Grande Council of Governments - Official site.

Texas Association of Regional Councils